Thaxterogaster caesiolamellatus is a species of fungus in the family Cortinariaceae.

Taxonomy 
It was originally described as new to science in 2006 as a variety of Cortinarius rufoallutus. After molecular and morphological evidence suggested that it was sufficiently unique to be considered a unique species, it was promoted to species status in 2014 and classified as Cortinarius caesiolamellatus. It was placed in the (subgenus Phlegmacium) of the large mushroom genus Cortinarius.

In 2022 the species was transferred from Cortinarius and reclassified as Thaxterogaster caesiolamellatus based on genomic data.

Habitat and distribution 
The mushroom is found in central and northern Europe, where it grows with spruce, and in Washington state (United States), where it additionally grows with pine. The lengthy fruiting season extends from June (in France) to November (in the United States).

See also

List of Cortinarius species

References

External links

caesiolamellatus
Fungi described in 2014
Fungi of Europe
Fungi of the United States
Fungi without expected TNC conservation status